Filyos (Hisarönü) is a belde town in Çaycuma district of Zonguldak Province, Turkey. It is a coastal town of the Black Sea Region at  situated at the mouth of the Filyos River. In the ancient history the name of the town was Tieion referring to the founder of the town. The settlement was declared a seat of township in 1954. The main economic activity of the town is firebrick industry. Tourism is also promising. Its population is 5268.

See also 
Filyos Natural-gas Processing Plant

References 

Populated places in Zonguldak Province
Towns in Turkey
Çaycuma
Populated coastal places in Turkey